KHDL (99.5 FM) is a radio station licensed to serve the community of Americus, Kansas. The station is owned by Robert Young, and airs a classic country/red dirt format.

The station was assigned the KHDL call letters by the Federal Communications Commission on June 20, 2016.

References

External links
 Official Website
 FCC Public Inspection File for KHDL
 

HDL
Radio stations established in 2016
2016 establishments in Kansas
Classic country radio stations in the United States
Lyon County, Kansas